ThreeJars, Inc. is a U.S.-based company specializing in teaching financial literacy to children aged 5 to 13 through an online allowance service.  They believe it is best to teach children about money early in life, through allowance, and hands-on experience. As of 2021, ThreeJars has gone out of business due to high operational costs as stated on their site. New companies have emerged (such as Greenlight, GoHenry, and Joon for Kids) with a similar mission to take its place in helping children in roughly the same age range learn about certain life skills.

Operation
ThreeJars works like an online bank for children, but instead of cash, parents pay allowances in IOUs, representing real money. Parents decide how the allowance will be allocated to their child's SAVE, SPEND and SHARE Jars. Parents can track chores and paying projects. Earned IOUs are credited to a child's jars, but the actual cash stays with the parent. A parent's approval is required for all financial transactions. Children learn to budget, set financial goals, delay gratification, earn interest, and make charitable donations. Children track their financial choices.

ThreeJars employs the financial expertise of Jean Chatzky.

ThreeJars is located in Westport, Connecticut and services the United States and Canada.

History
ThreeJars was founded by a husband and wife of six children: Anton Simunovic and Carlotta McClaran. The founders explain on their website:
Like most parents, my wife and I wanted our kids to lead happy, purposeful lives. But how to raise a child with a mind for managing money and a heart for helping others? Despite a career in finance, I found it hard to speak to my kids about money. While I didn't want them to feel entitled, I didn't want them to stress over money either. We all know that if you do not learn to manage money responsibly it will end up managing you. If we're lucky, we also understand that by helping others we are really helping ourselves. Both of these values are at the core of ThreeJars. THIS IS FAKE

Partnerships
ThreeJars has partnered with several experts (including Jean Chatzky), companies (including Rogers Communications and Parents Magazine), and charities in the fields of finance, parenting, and philanthropy. Charities that may be supported by ThreeJars clients include:
 American Society for the Prevention of Cruelty to Animals
 The Carbobfund.org Foundation
 Save The Children
 Whale and Dolphin Conversation Society
 The Nature Conservancy
 Smile Train
 Wolf Conservation Center
 Play Soccer Nonprofit International
 Sea Turtle Conservancy
 Right to Play
 Performing Animal Welfare Society
 The Mr. Holland's Opus Foundation

Reception
ThreeJars.com has been reviewed in various publications and websites, including Consumer Reports Money Crashers and Yahoo Finance

In general, reviewers agree that the site's independence from credit card payments is a benefit.  (Children request payouts from their virtual accounts, and parents receive an alert of the request, fulfilling the request out of their own cash on hand.)  However, they disliked the option of payouts in gift cards, noting that such cards limit a child's choices of how to spend their money, and often go unredeemed or partially redeemed. Since the Consumer Reports review, ThreeJars has ceased to offer gift cards as a redemption option.

References

External links
ThreeJars homepage

Personal finance education